Swine Creek is a stream in the U.S. state of Ohio.

According to tradition, Swine Creek received its name from a pioneer incident when a settler's pigs escaped and were later found at the creek.

References

Rivers of Ohio
Rivers of Geauga County, Ohio
Rivers of Trumbull County, Ohio